Union Township is a township in Union County, in the U.S. state of New Jersey. In the 18th century, the area that is now Union was then called Connecticut Farms. As of the 2020 United States census, the township's population was 59,728, an increase of 3,086 (+5.4%) from the 2010 census count of 56,642, which in turn reflected an increase of 2,237 (+4.1%) from the 54,405 counted in the 2000 census.

History
Settled in 1667, Union was the third English speaking settlement in New Jersey after Elizabeth and Newark, with the area that is now Union then called Connecticut Farms.

Union Township was the site of the Battle of Connecticut Farms. On June 6, 1780, British troops, led by Hessian General Wilhelm von Knyphausen, boarded boats on Staten Island bound for Elizabeth, New Jersey. At midnight, 5,000 troops started to land. They expected the Continental Army to give little resistance, believing that they were tired of the war and were poorly fed and paid. They also expected the citizens of New Jersey to welcome them. They were wrong on both counts and were unable to make their way to and through the Hobart Gap.

Union Township was incorporated as a township by an act of the New Jersey Legislature on November 23, 1808, from portions of Elizabeth Township, while the area was still part of Essex County. It became part of the newly formed Union County on March 19, 1857. Portions of the township have been taken to form Linden Township (March 4, 1861), Roselle Park, (March 22, 1901), Kenilworth (May 13, 1907) and Hillside (April 3, 1913). In 1946, a group of residents pushed for the township's name to be changed to "Connecticut Farms", citing the potential benefits to area residents and businesses from the broad awareness of the historical significance of the name.

The Self-Master Colony was a private experiment in housing the homeless; built on the Hoyt family mansion in Union Township in 1908. The colony was founded by Andress Small Floyd and his wife Lillian, lasting until 1938.

Geography
The Township of Union is located on the northern edge of Union County and is bordered by eight municipalities: Hillside to the east, Elizabeth to the southeast, Roselle Park and Kenilworth to the south and Springfield Township to the west. Northwest of the township lies Millburn, to the north lies Maplewood and to the northeast lies Irvington, all in Essex County.

According to the United States Census Bureau, the township had a total area of 9.08 square miles (23.52 km2), including 9.05 square miles (23.44 km2) of land and 0.03 square miles (0.08 km2) of water (0.35%).

Unincorporated communities, localities and place names located partially or completely within the township include Battle Hill, Connecticut Farms, Galloping Hill, Headlentown, Putnam Manor, Salem, Townley and Vauxhall.

Neighborhoods 
Five Points, area around the junction of Galloping Hill Road, Chestnut Street, Salem Road, Delaware Avenue, Walton Avenue, and Tucker Avenue.
Brookside Heights (Curryville), west of Vauxhall Road. 
Vauxhall, area of Union north of I-78 and west of Stuyvesant Avenue, with its own ZIP code 07088.
Union Center, area around the intersection of Morris and Stuyvesant Avenues.
Putnam Ridge, a section between Suburban Road, Morris Avenue, Twin Oaks Road, and Colonial Avenue.
Putnam Manor, an historic section between Colonial Avenue and Salem Road.
Orchard Park
Parkside Manor, a three-road section off of Union Terrace.
Larchmont Estates, area bordered by Larchmont Reservation (NW and NE edges), Morris Avenue (SW), Liberty Avenue (SE), and Joe Collins Park/Larchmont Reservation (NE edge).
Battle Hill, area served by Battle Hill Elementary School in west Union, bordered by Rahway River (W edge), Morris Avenue (N), the west branch of the Elizabeth River (E), and Route 22 (S).
Green Lane, new community between Kean University and Union Station.
Fairway Drive, community bordering the Galloping Hill Golf Course.
Rich Creek, the neighborhood of Richard Terrace

Demographics

2010 census

The Census Bureau's 2006–2010 American Community Survey showed that (in 2010 inflation-adjusted dollars) median household income was $73,722 (with a margin of error of +/− $4,858) and the median family income was $86,705 (+/− $3,822). Males had a median income of $54,811 (+/− $1,998) versus $47,144 (+/− $2,316) for females. The per capita income for the township was $31,135 (+/− $1,104). About 3.7% of families and 4.7% of the population were below the poverty line, including 4.7% of those under age 18 and 5.6% of those age 65 or over.

2000 census
As of the 2000 United States census of 2000, there were 54,405 people, 19,534 households, and 14,162 families residing in the township. The population density was 5,968.1 people per square mile (2,303.3/km2). There were 20,001 housing units at an average density of 2,194.1 per square mile (846.8/km2). An example of a diverse municipality in the United States, the racial makeup of the township was 67.66% White, 19.76% African American, 0.15% Native American, 7.72% Asian, 0.02% Pacific Islander, 2.44% from other races, and 2.24% from two or more races. Hispanic or Latino of any race were 8.93% of the population.

There were 19,534 households, out of which 32.0% had children under the age of 18 living with them, 55.5% were married couples living together, 13.1% had a female householder with no husband present, and 27.5% were non-families. 23.8% of all households were made up of individuals, and 13.3% had someone living alone who was 65 years of age or older. The average household size was 2.71 and the average family size was 3.25.

In the township the population was spread out, with 22.3% under the age of 18, 8.9% from 18 to 24, 29.3% from 25 to 44, 22.3% from 45 to 64, and 17.3% who were 65 years of age or older. The median age was 39 years. For every 100 females, there were 87.9 males. For every 100 females age 18 and over, there were 83.2 males.

The median income for a household in the township was $59,173, and the median income for a family was $68,707. Males had a median income of $45,299 versus $35,604 for females. The per capita income for the township was $24,768. About 3.0% of families and 4.2% of the population were below the poverty line, including 4.6% of those under age 18 and 5.5% of those age 65 or over.

Government

Local government 
Union Township is governed under the Township form of New Jersey municipal government, one of 141 municipalities (of the 564) statewide that use this form, the second-most commonly used form of government in the state. The Township Committee is comprised of five members, who are elected directly by the voters at-large in partisan elections to serve three-year terms of office on a staggered basis, with either one or two seats coming up for election each year as part of the November general election in a three-year cycle. At an annual reorganization meeting, the Township Committee selects one of its members to serve as Mayor. The Mayor, in addition to voting as a member of the Township Committee, presides over the meetings of the committee and carries out ceremonial duties.

, members of the Union Township Committee are Mayor Manuel T. Figueiredo (D, term on committee ends December 31, 2024; term as mayor ends 2022), Deputy Mayor Suzette Cavadas (D, term on committee and as deputy mayor ends 2022), Michele S. Delisfort (D, 2024), Joseph M. Florio (D, 2023) and Clifton People Jr. (D, 2022).

Mayors of Union

Federal, state, and county representation 
Union Township is in the 10th Congressional Districts and is part of New Jersey's 20th state legislative district.

Prior to the 2010 Census, Union Township had been split between the 7th and 10th Congressional Districts with different boundaries, a change made by the New Jersey Redistricting Commission that took effect in January 2013, based on the results of the November 2012 general elections. The redistricting plan that took effect in 2013 placed 31,611 residents living in the central and western portions of the township into the 7th District, while 25,031 residents in a semicircle that runs along the northern, eastern and southern borders of the township were placed into the 10th District.

 

Union County is governed by a Board of County Commissioners, whose nine members are elected at-large to three-year terms of office on a staggered basis with three seats coming up for election each year, with an appointed County Manager overseeing the day-to-day operations of the county. At an annual reorganization meeting held in the beginning of January, the board selects a Chair and Vice Chair from among its members. , Union County's County Commissioners are 
Chair Rebecca Williams (D, Plainfield, term as commissioner and as chair ends December 31, 2022), 
Vice Chair Christopher Hudak (D, Linden, term as commissioner ends 2023; term as vice chair ends 2022),
James E. Baker Jr. (D, Rahway, 2024),
Angela R. Garretson (D, Hillside, 2023),
Sergio Granados (D, Elizabeth, 2022),
Bette Jane Kowalski (D, Cranford, 2022), 
Lourdes M. Leon (D, Elizabeth, 2023),
Alexander Mirabella (D, Fanwood, 2024) and 
Kimberly Palmieri-Mouded (D, Westfield, 2024).
Constitutional officers elected on a countywide basis are
County Clerk Joanne Rajoppi (D, Union Township, 2025),
Sheriff Peter Corvelli (D, Kenilworth, 2023) and
Surrogate Susan Dinardo (acting).
The County Manager is Edward Oatman.

Politics
As of March 2011, there were a total of 31,155 registered voters in Union Township, of which 12,061 (38.7% vs. 41.8% countywide) were registered as Democrats, 3,928 (12.6% vs. 15.3%) were registered as Republicans and 15,157 (48.7% vs. 42.9%) were registered as Unaffiliated. There were 9 voters registered to other parties. Among the township's 2010 Census population, 55.0% (vs. 53.3% in Union County) were registered to vote, including 69.7% of those ages 18 and over (vs. 70.6% countywide).

In the 2012 presidential election, Democrat Barack Obama received 16,423 votes (70.7% vs. 66.0% countywide), ahead of Republican Mitt Romney with 6,464 votes (27.8% vs. 32.3%) and other candidates with 155 votes (0.7% vs. 0.8%), among the 23,235 ballots cast by the township's 33,589 registered voters, for a turnout of 69.2% (vs. 68.8% in Union County). In the 2008 presidential election, Democrat Barack Obama received 15,625 votes (63.8% vs. 63.1% countywide), ahead of Republican John McCain with 8,462 votes (34.5% vs. 35.2%) and other candidates with 189 votes (0.8% vs. 0.9%), among the 24,505 ballots cast by the township's 32,622 registered voters, for a turnout of 75.1% (vs. 74.7% in Union County). In the 2004 presidential election, Democrat John Kerry received 12,751 votes (57.9% vs. 58.3% countywide), ahead of Republican George W. Bush with 8,987 votes (40.8% vs. 40.3%) and other candidates with 174 votes (0.8% vs. 0.7%), among the 22,013 ballots cast by the township's 30,383 registered voters, for a turnout of 72.5% (vs. 72.3% in the whole county).

In the 2013 gubernatorial election, Democrat Barbara Buono received 53.4% of the vote (6,269 cast), ahead of Republican Chris Christie with 45.4% (5,334 votes), and other candidates with 1.2% (135 votes), among the 12,013 ballots cast by the township's 33,305 registered voters (275 ballots were spoiled), for a turnout of 36.1%. In the 2009 gubernatorial election, Democrat Jon Corzine received 7,628 ballots cast (53.0% vs. 50.6% countywide), ahead of Republican Chris Christie with 5,734 votes (39.8% vs. 41.7%), Independent Chris Daggett with 741 votes (5.1% vs. 5.9%) and other candidates with 113 votes (0.8% vs. 0.8%), among the 14,397 ballots cast by the township's 31,972 registered voters, yielding a 45.0% turnout (vs. 46.5% in the county).

Education 

The Union Public School District serves students in pre-kindergarten through twelfth grade. As of the 2018–19 school year, the district, comprised of 10 schools, had an enrollment of 7,219 students and 614.7 classroom teachers (on an FTE basis), for a student–teacher ratio of 11.7:1. The schools in the district (with 2018–19 enrollment data from the National Center for Education Statistics) are 
Battle Hill Elementary School (391 students; in grades Pre-K–4), 
Hannah Caldwell Elementary School (508; Pre-K–4), 
Connecticut Farms Elementary School (403; Pre-K–4), 
Franklin Elementary School (417; Pre-K–4), 
Livingston Elementary School (424; Pre-K–4), 
Washington Elementary School (575; Pre-K–4), 
Jefferson Elementary School (544; in grade 5), 
Burnet Middle School (961; 6–8), 
Kawameeh Middle School (674; 6–8) and 
Union High School (2,180; 9–12).

Union was threatened with being the first municipality north of the Mason–Dixon line to suffer from penalties as a result of school segregation. The area of Vauxhall was primarily black and the students enrolled at Jefferson Elementary School were disproportionately black, compared to the rest of the township. Union avoided problems by converting Jefferson Elementary into a sixth-grade only school called Central 6 and bused the Jefferson students to all the other elementary schools. It was later renamed Central 5 and is now Jefferson School, which is used as a one-year school for fifth-grade students.

Union is home to several private nursery schools and the Deron School, a private school for learning disabled students ages 5–13. St. Michael's Parish School and Holy Spirit School (founded in 1965) operate under the supervision of the Roman Catholic Archdiocese of Newark.

Kean University, dating back to 1855, serves a total student population of almost 16,000. Called New Jersey State Teachers College when it was located in Newark, the school moved to Union in 1958, was renamed Kean College in 1973 and was granted university status in 1997.

Transportation

Roads and highways

Union is traversed by the Garden State Parkway, Interstate 78, U.S. Route 22 and Route 82 (Morris Avenue).

The Parkway connects Kenilworth in the south to Hillside in the north. The Parkway includes interchanges 139A (Chestnut Street) / 139B (Route 82 West Union), interchanges 140 (Route 22 / Route 82 west) / 140A (Route 22 / Route 82 west) and interchange 141 (Vauxhall Road / Union).

Public transportation
NJ Transit offers rail service at the Union train station providing service on the Raritan Valley Line (formerly the mainline of the Lehigh Valley Railroad) to Newark Penn Station. The station opened in 2003 and includes a parking lot with over 450 spaces.

NJ Transit also provides bus service to New York City and New Jersey points on the 113, 114 and 117 routes to the Port Authority Bus Terminal in Midtown Manhattan, on the 65, 66 70 and 94 routes to Newark and local service on the 26 and 52.

Former Rahway Valley Railroad freight line, now abandoned, crosses through Union. This line, presently leased to Morristown and Erie Railway, is in the process of revitalization after which it will link to NJ Transit's Morris and Essex Lines at Summit and connect to Staten Island.

Notable buildings 

 The Union Watersphere, for many years the tallest water tower of its type in the world, stands 212 feet tall, holds 250,000 gallons of drinking water and is now also used as a cell phone tower. The landmark and icon inspired a former Union resident to create a website and museum (in Austin, Texas) dedicated to it.
 Union is home to several houses constructed totally of poured concrete, an experiment of Thomas Edison. The homes on Ingersoll Terrace include poured concrete interior walls with formed concrete plumbing.
 Union is home to a building in the shape of a ship at 2262 U.S. Route 22. Originally a restaurant and night club, it has changed ownership over the years, becoming a furniture store known as "The Flagship" and later The Wiz Home Electronics. It is currently a P. C. Richard & Son store.

Notable people 

People who were born in, residents of, or otherwise closely associated with Union Township include:

 Aminat Ayinde, the second runner-up from Cycle 12 of America's Next Top Model
 C. Louis Bassano (born 1942), politician who served in both the New Jersey General Assembly and the New Jersey Senate
 Isaiah Briscoe (born 1996), basketball player for the Kentucky Wildcats men's basketball team
 Freddie 'Red' Cochrane (1915–1993), professional boxer in the welterweight (147lb) division who became World Champion in 1941 in that class
 Joe Collins (1922–1989), first baseman for the New York Yankees from 1948 to 1957 A park on Liberty Avenue is named after him.
 Tom Coyne (1954–2017), mastering engineer
 Jonathan Townley Crane (1819–1880), clergyman, author and abolitionist
 Joseph Cryan (born 1961), represents the 20th legislative district in the New Jersey General Assembly
 Quenton DeCosey (born 1994), professional basketball player for Koroivos of the Greek Basket League
 Jamie Fox (1954–2017), political strategist
 Gina Genovese (born 1959), businesswoman and politician who has served as mayor of Long Hill Township
 Kayla Hoffman (born 1988), artistic gymnast
 Mildred Barry Hughes (1902–1995), the first woman elected to the New Jersey Senate, in 1965
 Ron Karkovice (born 1963), Major League baseball catcher from 1986 to 1997
 Amalya Lyle Kearse (born 1937), a judge of the United States Court of Appeals for the Second Circuit
 Myra Smith Kearse (1899–1982), physician and community leader
 Larry Kubin (born 1959), linebacker who played with the Washington Redskins from 1981 to 1984
 Kelly Kulick (born 1977), professional bowler who became the first woman ever to win a regular Professional Bowlers Association tour title
 Artie Lange (born 1967), comedian, actor, and former Howard Stern Show sidekick
 Ray Liotta (1954–2022), actor
 Ed Lucas (1939–2021), blind sportswriter who primarily covered the New York Yankees
 Elliott Maddox (born 1947), professional baseball player with both the New York Yankees 1974–1976 and the New York Mets 1978–1980
 Conde McGinley (born 1890), publisher of the anti-Communist and anti-Semitic weekly paper, Common Sense
 Bob Mischak (1932–2014), American football guard and tight end who played in the American Football League and the NFL
 Eulace Peacock (1914–1996), track and field athlete in the 1930s who was a top competitor of Jesse Owens
 Matthew John Rinaldo (1931–2008), represented New Jersey in the United States House of Representatives for twenty years, in the 12th congressional district (1973–1983) and in the 7th congressional district (1983–1993)
 Tyler Roberson (born 1994), professional basketball player for the Agua Caliente Clippers of the NBA G League
 Lawrence E. Roberts (1922–2004), pilot with the Tuskegee Airmen and a colonel in the United States Air Force
 Philip Rubin (born 1949), cognitive scientist, technologist and science administrator
 Anthony E. Russo (born 1926), former member of the New Jersey Senate who served as Mayor of Union
 Karl Schellscheidt (born 1968), soccer player, educator and entrepreneur
 Manfred Schellscheidt (born 1941), German-American soccer coach and former player and member of the National Soccer Hall of Fame
 Amy Simon (born 1971), planetary scientist at NASA's Goddard Space Flight Center
 Darnell Stapleton (born 1985), former offensive guard for the Pittsburgh Steelers who was a member of the Steelers' Super Bowl XLIII championship team
 Travis Taylor (born 1990), professional basketball player
 Bill Wenzel (1918–1987), cartoonist best known for his good girl art
 Robert Wuhl (born 1951), actor
 Darren Young (born 1983), professional wrestler formerly signed to WWE where he is one half of The Prime Time Players with Titus O'Neil

References

External links

 Union Township website
 Union Public School District
 
 School Data for the Union Public School District, National Center for Education Statistics
 Living in Union, N.J. – slideshow by The New York Times

 
1808 establishments in New Jersey
Populated places established in 1808
Township form of New Jersey government
Townships in Union County, New Jersey